Chuderov is a municipality and village in Ústí nad Labem District in the Ústí nad Labem Region of the Czech Republic. It has about 1,200 inhabitants.

Administrative parts
Villages of Chuderovec, Libov, Lipová, Radešín and Žežice are administrative parts of Chuderov.

References

Villages in Ústí nad Labem District